Clifton Heights may refer to the following towns and neighborhoods:

 in the United States
Clifton Heights, Louisville, Kentucky
Clifton Heights, St. Louis, Missouri
Clifton Heights, Cincinnati, Ohio - see CUF, Cincinnati
Clifton Heights, Pennsylvania

 in the United Kingdom
Clifton Heights, part of the Clifton Triangle in Clifton, Bristol